A short-title catalogue (or catalog) is a bibliographical resource that lists printed items in an abbreviated fashion, recording the most important words of their titles. The term is commonly encountered in the context of early modern books, which frequently have lengthy, descriptive titles on their title pages. Many short-title catalogues are union catalogues, listing items in the custody of multiple libraries.

Online short-title catalogues in fact tend to record complete (and therefore longer) title transcriptions.

Examples
 STC: A. W. Pollard and G. R. Redgrave, editors: A Short-Title Catalogue of Books Printed in England, Scotland and Ireland, and of English Books Printed Abroad 1475–1640. Second edition, revised and enlarged, begun by W. A. Jackson and F. S. Ferguson, completed by K. F. Pantzer. London: The Bibliographical Society. Vol. I (A–H). 1986. Pp. 620. Vol. II (I–Z). 1976. Pp. 504. Vol. III (Indexes, addenda, corrigenda). 1991. Pp. 430.  
 Wing: Short-Title Catalogue of Books Printed in England, Scotland, Ireland, Wales, and British America, and of English Books Printed in Other Countries, 1641–1700 by Donald Goddard Wing
 ESTC: English Short Title Catalogue, online database covering 1473–1800 (and incorporating and updating the STC and Wing)
 NSTC: , covering English books 1801–1919
 ISTC: Incunabula Short Title Catalogue, online database covering incunabula, i.e. books printed up to 1500
 STCN: Short Title Catalogue Netherlands, online database covering the Netherlands, 1540–1800
 STCV: Short Title Catalogus Vlaanderen (Short Title Catalogue Flanders), online database of books printed in Flanders (including Brussels) prior to 1801
 BM STC: Short-title catalogues of the British Museum (now the British Library), covering various countries and centuries
 USTC: Universal Short Title Catalogue, online database of all books printed in Europe up to 1650
 Bod-inc.: A Catalogue of Books Printed in the Fifteenth Century now in the Bodleian Library

See also
 History of books
 Liste der Verzeichnisse historischer Druckschriften (in German)

Bibliography